The lesser honeyguide (Indicator minor) is a species of bird in the family Indicatoridae.

Range
It is found in Angola, Benin, Botswana, Burkina Faso, Burundi, Cameroon, Central African Republic, Chad, Republic of the Congo, Democratic Republic of the Congo, Ivory Coast, Equatorial Guinea, Eritrea, Eswatini, Ethiopia, Gabon, Gambia, Ghana, Guinea, Guinea-Bissau, Kenya, Lesotho, Liberia, Malawi, Mali, Mozambique, Namibia, Niger, Nigeria, Rwanda, Senegal, Sierra Leone, Somalia, South Africa, Sudan, Tanzania, Togo, Uganda, Zambia, and Zimbabwe.

Gallery

References

External links
 Lesser honeyguide - Species text in The Atlas of Southern African Birds.
 YouTube Video: lesser honeyguide (Indicator minor)

lesser honeyguide
Birds of Sub-Saharan Africa
lesser honeyguide
Taxonomy articles created by Polbot